Holiday economics refers to the policy in the Philippines introduced by President Gloria Macapagal Arroyo to move the observance of the certain public holidays to the nearest weekend.

Background

Introduction by Arroyo
The Executive Order 292, or the National Administrative Code of 1987 defines several of the  public national holidays in the Philippines. There are two types of public holidays in the Philippines – regular and special non-working holidays. Schools in all levels suspend classes regardless of the public holidays while employers may or may not require workers to report to work.

Those who would have report to work if not for the holiday but did not render work are paid their regular rate. Employees required to work due to their nature of their work are paid extra of their daily rate and cost of living daily allowance depending if the holiday is a regular (200%) or a special non-working holiday (130%). If a holiday falls on a non-working day for the employee, the employee is not compensated.

President Gloria Macapagal Arroyo, Proclamation No. 1211 in January 2007 declaring Independence Day which falls on June 12 a working holiday, and the day before a non-working holiday – effectively moving the holiday. However rites organized by the government remained observed on the actual date.

She would sign into law Republic Act 9492 the Holiday Economics Law, in Jul 24, 2007 which allows the observance of otherwise fixed public holidays except for New Year's Day on January 1, All Saint's Day on November 1, Christmas Day on December 25, and the last day of the year, December 31 to the nearest Monday. The Senate bill of the law was introduced by Senator Joker Arroyo. The measure was enacted in a bid to boost domestic tourism.

Abolishment of policy by Aquino
Arroyo's successor, Benigno Aquino III would retain the policy in his first few months in office. The business sector has opposed the policy due to extra costs associated on paying workers extra wage on public holidays. He would issue Proclamation 82 on December 20, 2010, ending the holiday economics policy. Under Republic Act 9492, the president has the "prerogative" to move or retain the movable holidays specified in the law.

Reintroduction by Marcos
President Bongbong Marcos reintroduced the holiday economics policy by issuing Proclamation No. 90 on November 11, 2022 which concerns the observance of public holidays for 2023. This was enacted as a means to boost the domestic tourism industry which was impacted by the COVID-19 pandemic and related lockdowns.

Movement of holiday observances
The holiday economics law does not move the actual dates of the holidays but rather "rationalizes" the observance of it by moving its observance to the nearest weekend (Monday). This would prevent holidays in the middle of weekdays and would create long weekends.

Example

Notes

References

2007 introductions
2007 in the Philippines
Presidency of Gloria Macapagal Arroyo
Presidency of Benigno Aquino III
Presidency of Bongbong Marcos
Economic history of the Philippines
 Holiday